This is a list of countries by tomato production in 2016 and 2017, based on data from the Food and Agriculture Organization Corporate Statistical Database. The estimated total world production for tomatoes in 2017 was 182,301,395 metric tonnes, an increase of 1.6% from 179,508,401 tonnes in 2016. China was by far the largest producer, accounting for nearly 33% of global production. Dependent territories are shown in italics.

Production by country

>1,000,000 tonnes

100,000–1,000,000 tonnes

10,000–100,000 tonnes

1,000–10,000 tonnes

<1,000 tonnes

Notes

References 

Tomato production
Tomato
Tomato production
Production by country
Tomatoes
Tomatoes